Greatest Hits/The Deluxe Edition is a greatest hits album by David Lee Roth, compiling his solo work from 1985 to 1994.

Track listings

CD

DVD

References 

David Lee Roth albums
2013 greatest hits albums